The Belize women's national volleyball team represents Belize in international women's volleyball senior competitions and friendly matches.

Belize also features a U23 national volleyball team.

References

External links
 Volleyball Association of Belize

National women's volleyball teams
Volleyball
Volleyball in Belize